Ahmad Al-Osta (born 7 October 1968) is a retired freestyle wrestler from Syria. He represented his country at the 1992 Summer Olympics and the 1996 Summer Olympics.

References

External links
 Sports-Reference profile
 International Wrestling Database profile

Living people
1968 births
Syrian male sport wrestlers
Olympic wrestlers of Syria
Wrestlers at the 1992 Summer Olympics
Wrestlers at the 1996 Summer Olympics
Asian Games medalists in wrestling
Wrestlers at the 1994 Asian Games
Wrestlers at the 1998 Asian Games
Wrestlers at the 2002 Asian Games
Asian Games silver medalists for Syria
Medalists at the 1998 Asian Games
Asian Wrestling Championships medalists
21st-century Syrian people
20th-century Syrian people